This is the list of the episodes for the American cooking and reality television series Restaurant: Impossible, produced by Food Network. The premise of the series is that within two days and on a budget of $10,000, celebrity chef Robert Irvine renovates a failing American restaurant with the goal of helping to restore it to profitability and prominence. Irvine is assisted by a designer (usually Taniya Nayak or Lynn Kegan, but sometimes Vanessa Deleon, Cheryl Torrenueva, Krista Watterworth, Yvette Irene, or Nicole Faccuito), along with general contractor Tom Bury, who sometimes does double duty as both general contractor and designer. After assessing the problems with the restaurant, Robert Irvine typically creates a plan for the new decor, oversees the cleaning of the restaurant, reduces the size of the menu and improves the food, develops a promotional activity, educates the restaurant's owners, or trains the staff, as needed by each restaurant. As of February 2023, the show has completed missions in 42 states and the District of Columbia; remaining states are Alaska, Hawai'i, Iowa, Kansas, North Dakota, South Dakota, Utah, and Vermont.

Episodes

Season 1

Season 2

Season 3

Season 4

Season 5

Season 6

Season 7

Season 8

Season 9

Season 10

Season 11

Season 12

Season 13

Season 14

Season 15

Season 16

 Dumplings in Delaware
 Revisited: No Laughing Matter
 Cleaning Up in Mississippi
 Revisited: An Owner Losing Control
 Help is On the Way
 Revisited: Ruffled Feathers
 Old Habits Die Hard
 New Roles, New Results
 Revisited: Chaos in the Kitchen
 Out with Old, In with New
 Revisited: Family Recovering
 Saving a Piece of History
 Revisited: Going Down
 Restaurant on the Rocks
 Revisited: Family Matters
 Cajun Seafood Crisis
 Revisited: Life Savings
 Chattanooga Blues
 Lost in the Bayou
 Revisited: For the Troops
 Greek Tragedy
 Most Extreme Moments

Season 17 

 Quarantine Check-In
 First Episode Rewatch
 Saving a Pastor's Passion
 Fixing a Family in Houston
 Revisited: Helping Our Own
 Back on Track in Glendora
 Ginger Monkey is Going Under
 Revisited: Out of Date
 Revisited: Soul of a Marriage
 Back in Business: Losing Hope in Mississippi
 Back in Business: Leadership Lessons in Florida
 Back in Business: Reuniting Family in Missouri
 Back in Business: Branching Out
 Back in Business: Back Nine
 Back in Business: Garrett's

Season 18

 Moving On in Montana
 Destination, Hawk Springs
 Colorado Couple in Crisis
 Bogged Down in Buffalo
 Community Hub in Chaos
 Taking Ownership in Vegas
 Saving an American Dream
 A Dream in Shambles
 House of Cards
 Listless in Louisiana
 Friends in Need
 Nancy Foots the Bill
 Back in Business: New Tricks
 Back in Business: Al's Seafood
 Back in Business: Rosier Days
 Back in Business: Perseverance

Season 19 

 The Sinking Anchor
 R.E.S.P.E.C.T.
 Floundering Fish House
 Sub Shop SOS
 Restoring a Reputation
 A Friendship in Peril
 Big Trouble in Tennessee
 Irish Eyes Are Frowning
 Soul Food in the Dark
 The Sinking Ship Inn
 Resentment on the Bayou
 The Dutiful Son
 Delusions of Grandeur

Season 20 

 Extreme British Makeover
 A Big Mess in Texas
 Big Ego, Big Trouble
 Dirtiest. Kitchen. Ever.
 Burnt Out in Berkeley
 Virtually Impossible
 Slumping Sales in San Jose
 Out with the Old, In with the New
 Not So Peachy Keen
 Holding on to the Past
 It's Not Rocket Science
 Hard Knocks in Hendersonville
 No Help Wanted

Season 21 

 The Final Shot
 Best Friends Forever
 My Way or the Highway
 Family Recipe for Disaster
 Marriage on the Rocks
 Mistrust and Malaise in Madison
 Fighting for Your Family
 Schooling a Teacher
 Legacy on the Line
 Anguish in Abilene
 A Trifecta of Failure
 Stuck in the Old School
 Lifting the Weight
 Small Town, Big Problems

Season 22

References 

Restaurant Impossible
American cooking television series